Kiacatoo is a locality in western New South Wales, Australia.

References

External links

Towns in New South Wales
Lachlan Shire